Corkscrew was a steel roller coaster located at 'Playland At the PNE' amusement park in Vancouver, British Columbia, Canada.  It is famous for its appearance in the 2006 motion picture Final Destination 3 (known in the movie as Devil's Flight) and the 2012 motion picture Diary of a Wimpy Kid: Dog Days, as well as the popular television series Smallville (season three's "Magnetic"). 

The bonus disc of the Final Destination 3 DVD set includes behind-the-scenes footage shot on and around the coaster, documenting the challenges involved in shooting the complex scenes.

As of March 2019, it is no longer listed on the park’s website and has been sold to an unannounced purchaser.

History 

The Dutch manufacturer Vekoma originally built the ride in 1985 for Boblo Island park in Amherstburg, Ontario, Canada. The corkscrew concept was introduced by Arrow Dynamics in 1975 with a roller coaster that now operates at Silverwood in Idaho. Several models can be found throughout the world, some with additional inversions such as a vertical loop.

References

External links
  Playland's official website

Buildings and structures in Vancouver
Roller coasters in British Columbia
Roller coasters introduced in 1994